The Germany's Sports Hall of Fame is the national sports hall of fame in Germany, initiated 2006. The inductions are made by Stiftung Deutsche Sporthilfe, Deutscher Olympischer Sportbund and Verband Deutscher Sportjournalisten.

Members 

Uli Hoeneß (Football) was introduced in 2009, but had to resign after he was sentenced to a imprisonment for tax evasion in 2014.

Controversy 
Germany's Sports Hall of Fame caused a lot of criticism since five former Nazi Party members were included. It was even called a “Hall of Shame”.  Nazi Party members include football manager Sepp Herberger, Olympic riding champion Josef Neckermann, former IOC member Willi Daume, cyclist Gustav Kilian and middle distance runner Rudolf Harbig.

The Hall of Fame also includes two victims of the Nazis, cyclist Albert Richter who was murdered by Gestapo in 1939 and wrestler Werner Seelenbinder who was executed in 1944.

References

External links 
Germany's Sports Hall of Fame (in German)

All-sports halls of fame
Sports museums in Germany
 
Awards established in 2006
Halls of fame in Germany
2006 establishments in Germany